Lal Narayan Sinha was  a lawyer who served as the Attorney General of India between 9 August 1979 and 8 August 1983, and as the Solicitor General of India from 17 July 1972 until 5 April 1977. He was educated at Patna Law College, Patna University.

Sinha was the first Attorney General to represent a private party during their term in office. Before becoming the Solicitor General of India, he was the Advocate General of Bihar for several years.

Family and early life
His son Lalit Mohan Sharma became the Chief Justice of India. His grandson Justice Parthasarthy currently serves as a Judge in the Patna High Court.

References

20th-century Indian lawyers
India
Solicitors General of India
Year of birth missing
Year of death missing
People from Gaya district
Senior Advocates in India